The Wurtz Homestead, located on North Fork Road,  north of Ford in the Flathead National Forest, near Polebridge, Montana, was listed on the National Register of Historic Places in 1996. The listing included three contributing buildings.

Included are:
1917 homestead cabin
1920 family home
1944 root cellar
A garage (1954) and a sauna (1970s) are deemed non-contributing.

References

Houses on the National Register of Historic Places in Montana
Houses completed in 1913
National Register of Historic Places in Flathead County, Montana
1913 establishments in Montana
Rustic architecture in Montana
Log cabins in the United States
Log buildings and structures on the National Register of Historic Places in Montana
Houses in Flathead County, Montana